Diede José Gomes Lameiro (1934 – 31 March 2021) was a Brazilian professional football coach.

Career
Born in Casa Branca, Lameiro began his career as a basketball player. He began his football career in 1967 as manager of Ferroviária. He had three further spells as manager with the club – in 1980, 1982, and 1983. Under his management the club competed in the Campeonato Brasileiro Série A in 1983, their only time in the competition.

He also managed São Paulo Palmeiras, and Figueirense.

Later life and death
Lameiro died in hospital in São José dos Campos on 31 March 2021 aged 87. He had a wife, three children, eight grandchildren, and eight great-grandchildren.

References

1934 births
2021 deaths
Brazilian football managers
Figueirense FC managers
São Paulo FC managers
Sociedade Esportiva Palmeiras managers
Brazilian basketball players
Associação Ferroviária de Esportes managers